Ernie Everett (3 January 1885 – 10 March 1938) was an Australian rules footballer who played with Fitzroy in the Victorian Football League (VFL).

Fitzroy (VFL)
He made his debut, as one of the seven new players for Fitzroy — i.e., Ernie Everett, Jack Furness, Cliff Hutton, Frank Lamont, 
Tom Moloughney, Danny Murphy, and Eric Watson — against Melbourne on 29 April 1911.

Notes

External links 
		

1885 births
1938 deaths
Australian rules footballers from Victoria (Australia)
Fitzroy Football Club players
Brunswick Football Club players